List of Guggenheim Fellowships awarded in 2006.

U.S. and Canadian Fellows

A
 Kathryn Alexander, Composer, New Haven, Connecticut; Associate Professor of Music Composition, Yale University: Music composition.
 Cristian Amigo, Composer, Astoria, New York; Visiting Scholar, Center for Latin American and Caribbean Studies, New York University; Adjunct Professor, College of Staten Island, City University of New York: Music composition.
 Olive Ayhens, Artist, Brooklyn, New York: Painting.

B
 Markus Baenziger, Artist, New York City; Assistant Professor of Fine Arts, Brandeis University: Sculpture.
 Ulrich Baer, Associate Professor of German and Comparative Literature and Chair, Department of German, New York University: The representation of clouds and the art of sublimation, 1800-1970.
 Dare Baldwin, Professor of Psychology, University of Oregon: Understanding others' actions.
 Thomas J. Barfield, Professor of Anthropology and Chair, Department of Anthropology, Boston University: Political legitimacy in Afghanistan.
 Catherine Barnett, Poet, New York City; Adjunct Faculty, Creative Writing Program, and Liberal Arts Program, Paul McGhee Division, New York University: Poetry.
 Emily Barton, Writer, Brooklyn, New York; Writer-in-Residence, Eugene Lang College, New School University: Fiction.a
 Todd Bertolaet, Professor of Photography, Florida A & M University: Photography.
 Douglas Biow, Professor of Italian and Comparative Literature, University of Texas, Austin: Anticonformist authors in 16th-century Italy.
 Michael R. Blatt, Regius Professor of Botany and Head of Plant Sciences, University of Glasgow: Membrane protein mobility and dynamics.
 Judy Blunt, Associate Professor of Creative Writing and Nonfiction, University of Montana: Essays on the legend of the strong Western woman.
 Hilary Brace, Artist, Santa Barbara, California: Drawing.
 Marco Breuer, Photographer, Hudson, New York; Adjunct Faculty Member in Photography, M.F.A. Program, Bard College: Photography.
 Ellen Bromberg, Choreographer, Salt Lake City, Utah; Associate Professor of Modern Dance, University of Utah: Choreography.
 Timothy Brook, Professor of Chinese History and Principal, St. John's College, University of British Columbia: Social suffering and social policy in the Chinese tradition.
 Roxane Butterfly, Choreographer, New York City; Artistic Director, Worldbeats: Choreography.

C
 Christopher Caines, Choreographer, Brooklyn, New York; Artistic Director, Christopher Caines Dance Company: Choreography.
 Scott Cairns, Poet, Columbia, Missouri; Professor of English, University of Missouri: Poetry.
 Wally Cardona, Choreographer, Brooklyn, New York; Artistic Director, WCV, Inc: Choreography.
 Bruce G. Carruthers, Professor of Sociology, Northwestern University: The evolution of economic trust.
 Alessandra Casella, Professor of Economics, Columbia University: Storable votes.
 David W. Christianson, Roy and Diana Vagelos Professor in Chemistry and Chemical Biology, University of Pennsylvania: Complexes between biological macromolecules and nonbiological nanomolecules.
 Jill Ciment, Writer, Gainesville, Florida; Professor of English, University of Florida: Fiction.
 Paul M. Cobb, Associate Professor of Islamic History, and Fellow of the Medieval Institute, University of Notre Dame: Usama ibn Munqidh's memoirs and the Muslims in the age of the Crusades.
 Patricia Cline Cohen, Professor of History, University of California, Santa Barbara: Thomas and Mary Gove Nichols and marriage reform in antebellum America.
 Donald Crockett, Composer, La Cañada, California; Professor of Composition and Chair, Composition Department, Thornton School of Music, University of Southern California: Music composition.

D
 Tracy Daugherty, Professor of English, Oregon State University: A biography of Donald Barthelme.
 Anthony Davis, Composer, San Diego, California; Professor of Music, University of California, San Diego: Music composition.
 Sally Denton, Writer, Santa Fe, New Mexico: Jessie and John Frémont and the shaping of America.
 Dennis Des Chene, Professor of Philosophy, Washington University: Wisdom and the new science in the 17th century.
 Nathaniel Deutsch, Associate Professor of Religion, Swarthmore College: Ansky and the invention of Jewish ethnography.
 Helen DeWitt, Writer, Berlin, Germany: Fiction.
 Michael Dine, Professor of Physics, University of California, Santa Cruz: Preparation for the large hadron collider.
 Frank Dobbin, Professor of Sociology, Harvard University: Equal opportunity in practice.
 Julia V. Douthwaite, Professor of French and Assistant Provost for International Studies, University of Notre Dame: A literary history of the French Revolution.
 Michael W. Doyle, Harold Brown Professor of International Affairs, Law, and Political Science, Columbia University: The ethics, politics, and law of preventative self-defense.
 Paul Dresher, Composer, Berkeley, California: Music composition.
 Jean-Marie Dufour, Professor of Economics and Canada Research Chair in Econometrics, University of Montréal: Econometric problems in macroeconomics and finance.

E
 Robert Edelman, Professor of History, University of California, San Diego: Moscow soccer audiences and popular attitudes toward communism.
 Michael S. Engel, Professor and Senior Curator, Division of Entomology, Natural History Museum, and Department of Ecology and Evolutionary Biology, University of Kansas: Evolution of the termites and global changes in carbon recycling.
 Martín Espada, Poet, Amherst, Massachusetts; Professor of English, University of Massachusetts: Poetry.

F
 Hany Farid, Associate Professor of Computer Science, Dartmouth College: Digital forensics.
 Paula S. Fass, Margaret Byrne Professor of History, University of California, Berkeley: Parents and children in American history, 1800-2000.
 Gillian Feeley-Harnik, Kathleen Gough Collegiate Professor of Anthropology, University of Michigan: Kinship and ecology in 19th-century Great Britain and America.
 Steven Feierman, Professor of History and Sociology of Science, University of Pennsylvania: Social medicine in Africa.
 Martha Feldman, Professor of Music and the Humanities, University of Chicago: The castrato as myth.
 Peter Fend, Artist, Berlin, Germany: Visual art.
 Judy Fox, Artist, New York City: Sculpture.
 Dana Frankfort, Artist, Long Island City, New York: Painting.
 Daisy Fried, Poet, Northampton, Massachusetts; Grace Hazard Conkling Writer-in-Residence, Smith College: Poetry.
 Barbara Fuchs, Associate Professor of Romance Languages, University of Pennsylvania: "Moorish" culture and the conflictive construction of Spain.
 Diana Fuss, Professor of English, Princeton University: Poetry and the art of resuscitation.

G
 Louis Galambos, Professor of History, The Johns Hopkins University; Editor, The Papers of Dwight David Eisenhower; Maguire Chair, Kluge Center, Library of Congress: The Creative Society, and the price Americans paid for being creative.
 Alison P. Galvani, Assistant Professor of Epidemiology and Public Health, Yale University: Game-theoretic insights into population adherence of influenza vaccination policies.
 David Garland, Arthur T. Vanderbilt Professor of Law and Professor of Sociology, New York University: Capital punishment and American society.
 Nina Rattner Gelbart, Professor of History and Anita Johnson Wand Professor of Women's Studies, Occidental College: Frenchwomen of science in the 18th century.
 Michael Gitlin, Film Maker, Brooklyn, New York; Assistant Professor of Film and Media Studies, Hunter College, City University of New York: Film making.
 Jane M. Gitschier, Professor of Medicine and Pediatrics, University of California, San Francisco: The genetic basis of absolute-pitch perception.
 Arthur Goldhammer, Translator, Cambridge, Massachusetts; Senior Affiliate, Center for European Studies, Harvard University: Democracy in America since Tocqueville.
 Rebecca Newberger Goldstein, Writer, Cambridge, Massachusetts; Visiting Professor of Philosophy, Trinity College: Fiction.
 Maria Elena González, Artist, Brooklyn, New York: Sculpture and installation art.
 Dena Goodman, Professor of History and Women's Studies, University of Michigan: Women's letter-writing in the 18th century.
 Katie Grinnan, Artist, Los Angeles; Lecturer, University of California, Irvine: Sculpture.
 Rinne Groff, Playwright, New York City; Instructor in Dramatic Writing, Tisch School of the Arts, New York University: Play writing.
 Ruth Ellen Gruber, Writer and Independent Scholar, Morre, Italy: Imaginary Wild Wests in contemporary Europe.
 Allan Gurganus, Writer, Hillsborough, North Carolina: Fiction.

H
 Carl Haber, Senior Scientist, Physics Division, Lawrence Berkeley National Laboratory: Optical methods to recover sound from mechanical recordings.
 Judith Hall, Poet, Malibu, California; Core Faculty Member, M.F.A. in Poetry Program, New England College; Poetry Editor, The Antioch Review: Poetry.
 Mark Halliday, Poet, Athens, Ohio; Professor of English, Ohio University: Poetry.
 Karen V. Hansen, Professor of Sociology and Women's and Gender Studies, Brandeis University: The Dakota Sioux and Scandinavian homesteaders, 1900-1930.
 Dayna Hanson, Choreographer, Seattle, Washington: Choreography.
 Mike Heffley, Writer, Portland, Oregon;Adjunct Professor, Axia College of Western International University, Phoenix, Arizona: The folkloric and the radical in new and improvised music.
 Michael Henry Heim, Professor of Slavic Languages and Literatures, and of Comparative Literature, University of California, Los Angeles: The theory and practice of advanced language acquisition.
 Frank Herrmann, Artist, Cincinnati, Ohio; Professor of Fine Arts, University of Cincinnati: Painting.
 Constance Valis Hill, Five College Associate Professor of Dance, Hampshire College: A cultural history of tap dancing in America since 1900.
 Kay E. Holekamp, Professor of Zoology, Michigan State University: Development of role-reversed sex differences in behavior and morphology.
 Thomas Hurka, Chancellor Henry N. R. Jackman Distinguished Chair in Philosophical Studies, University of Toronto: British moral philosophy from Sidgwick to Ross.
 Lewis Hyde, Writer, Gambier, Ohio; Richard L. Thomas Professor of Creative Writing, Kenyon College: Our cultural commons.

I
 Yoko Inoue, Artist, Brooklyn, New York; Visiting Faculty, Bennington College: Installation art.

J
 Daniel James, Bernardo Mendel Chair of Latin American History, Indiana University: Class, ethnicity, and identity formation in an Argentine meatpacking community.
 Scott Johnson, Composer, New York City: Music composition.

K
 Zsolt Kadar, Photographer, Los Angeles: Photography.
 Douglas Kahn, Director of Technocultural Studies, University of California, Davis: History of the recognition of natural radio phenomena.
 Carla Kaplan, Professor of English and Gender Studies, University of Southern California: The white women of the Harlem Renaissance.
 Patrick Radden Keefe, Writer, Brooklyn; Program Officer and Fellow, The Century Foundation, New York City: Networks of cross-border criminal and terrorist organizations.
 Garret Keizer, Writer, Sutton, Vermont: A humanistic consideration of noise.
 Brigit Pegeen Kelly, Poet, Arcata, California; Professor of English, University of Illinois, Urbana-Champaign: Poetry.
 Suki Kim, Writer, New York City: Fiction.
 Diane P. Koenker, Professor of History, University of Illinois, Urbana-Champaign: Proletarian tourism and vacations in the USSR.
 Joseph Leo Koerner, Professor in the History of Art, Courtauld Institute of Art: Hieronymus Bosch, Pieter Bruegel, and the painting of everyday life.
 Schuyler S. Korban, Professor of Molecular Genetics and Biotechnology, University of Illinois, Urbana-Champaign: Studies of plant-based vaccines.
 Frank J. Korom, Associate Professor of Religion and Anthropology, Boston University: The impact of modernity on traditional Bengali scroll painters and singers.

L
 John A. Lane, Independent Scholar, Leiden, The Netherlands: The life and work of the 17th-century typefounder and punchcutter Christoffel van Dijck.
 Brooke Larson, Professor of History, Stony Brook University: Aymara Indians and struggles over power, knowledge, and identity in the Bolivian Andes.
 Anthony J. La Vopa, Professor of History, North Carolina State University: The labor of the mind and the specter of effeminacy in Enlightenment cultures.
 Carol Lawton, Professor of Art History, and Chair, Department of Art and Art History, Lawrence University: Popular Greek religion and the votive reliefs from the Athenian Agora.
 John L'Heureux, Writer, Stanford, California; Professor of English Emeritus, Stanford University: Fiction.
 Cynthia Lin, Artist, New York City; Guest Faculty in Visual Arts, Sarah Lawrence College: Drawing and painting.
 John M. Lipski, Professor of Spanish and Linguistics, Pennsylvania State University: Afro-Hispanic speech today.
 Jia-Ming Liu, Professor of Electrical Engineering, University of California, Los Angeles: Three-dimensional intracellular laser nanoscopy.
 Jianguo (Jack) Liu, Rachel Carson Chair in Ecological Sustainability and Director of Center for Systems Integration and Sustainability, Michigan State University: Pandas, people, and policies.
 Yu Liu, Professor of English, Niagara County Community College: Chinese gardening ideas in the English landscaping revolution.
 Donald S. Lopez, Jr., Arthur E. Link Distinguished University Professor of Buddhist and Tibetan Studies, University of Michigan: A short history of the Buddha.
 Deidre Shauna Lynch, Associate Professor of English, Indiana University, Bloomington: A cultural history of the love of literature.

M
 L. Mahadevan, Gordon McKay Professor of Applied Mathematics and Mechanics, Professor of Systems Biology, and Professor of Organismic and Evolutionary Biology, Harvard University: Integrative pathophysiology of sickle-cell disease.
 Jake Mahaffy, Film Maker, Roanoke, Virginia; Assistant Professor of Film, Hollins University: Film making.
 Janis Mattox, Composer, Woodside, California: Music composition.
 Joseph Mazur, Writer, Marlboro, Vermont; Professor of Mathematics, Marlboro College: A memoir.
 Richard McCann, Writer, Washington, D.C.; Professor of Literature, M.F.A. Program in Creative Writing, American University: A memoir.
 Neil McWilliam, Walter H. Annenberg Professor of Art and Art History, Duke University: Tradition, identity, and the visual arts in France, 1900-1914.
 William Hamilton Meeks, III, George David Birkhoff Professor of Mathematics, University of Massachusetts, Amherst: The global structure of complete embedded minimal surfaces in three-manifolds.
 Jonathan M. Metzl, Associate Professor of Women's Studies and Psychiatry, and Director, Program in Culture, Health, and Medicine, University of Michigan: Race, stigma, and the diagnosis of schizophrenia.
 Patricia Cox Miller, W. Earl Ledden Professor of Religion, Syracuse University: The corporeal imagination in late antiquity.
 Mark Mitchell, Writer, Gainesville, Florida; Managing Editor, Subtropics Magazine, University of Florida: A biography of Frederic Prokosch.
 Fen Montaigne, Free-lance Writer, Pelham, New York: The Antarctic Peninsula, penguins, and a warming world.
 Susan Brind Morrow, Writer, Chatham, New York: The Pyramid Texts and the development of religious imagery.
 Harriet Murav, Professor and Department Head of Slavic Languages and Literatures, and Professor of World and Comparative Literature, University of Illinois, Urbana-Champaignn: Soviet Yiddish and Russian-Jewish literature of the 20th century.
 Megan Mylan, Documentary Film Maker, New York City: Film making.

N
 Sally Ann Ness, Professor of Anthropology, University of California, Riverside: An ethnographic study of Yosemite tourism.
 Wilbur Niewald, Artist, Mission, Kansas; Professor of Painting Emeritus, Kansas City Art Institute, Missouri: Painting.
 Ashley Null, Visiting Research Fellow, Faculties of Divinity, Cambridge University; Visiting Research Fellow in Theology, Humboldt University, Berlin: A critical edition of Thomas Cranmer's Great Commonplaces.

O
 Gina Ochsner, Writer, Keizer, Oregon; Adjunct Instructor, George Fox University: Fiction.
 Peter Orner, Writer, San Francisco; Assistant Professor of Creative Writing, San Francisco State University: Fiction.
 Anthony Pagden, Distinguished Professor of Political Science, University of California, Los Angeles: A history of European cosmopolitanism.

P
 Roxy Paine, Artist, Brooklyn, New York: Sculpture.
 Nina C. Paley, Animator and Film Maker, New York City; Adjunct Faculty Member, Parsons School of Design: Film making.
 Eric Patrick, Film Maker, Greensboro, North Carolina; Assistant Professor of Broadcasting and Cinema, University of North Carolina, Greensboro: Film making.
 Jamie Peck, Professor of Geography and Sociology, University of Wisconsin, Madison: A critical study of neoliberalism.
 Nancy Lee Peluso, Professor of Society and Environment, and Program Director, Berkeley Workshop in Environmental Politics, University of California, Berkeley: Territoriality, violence, and the production of landscape history in West Kalimantan, Indonesia.
 Theda Perdue, Atlanta Distinguished Term Professor of History, University of North Carolina, Chapel Hill: American Indians in the segregated South, 1870-1970.
 Patrick Phillips, Associate Professor of Biology, University of Oregon: Evolution of genetic architecture.
 John Pollini, Professor of Classical Art and Archaeology, University of Southern California: Christian destruction and desecration of images of classical antiquity.
 Richard B. Primack, Professor of Biology, Boston University: Climate change in Thoreau's Concord.
 Laurence Pringle, Free-lance Writer, West Nyack, New York: Children's books about evolution.
 Michael D. Purugganan, Professor of Biology, New York University: The ecological transcriptome.

Q
 George Quasha, Video Artist, Barrytown, New York: Video.

R
 Arden Reed, Arthur M. and Fanny M. Dole Professor of English, Pomona College: Slow art, from tableaux vivants to James Turrell.
 Andrew C. Revkin, Reporter, The New York Times: The pursuit of progress on a planet in flux.
 John V. Robinson, Writer, Crockett, California; Adjunct English Instructor, Las Positas College and Diablo Valley College: The folklore of the high-steel ironworkers.
 Philippe Rochat, Professor of Psychology, Emory University: Origins of possession and sharing.
 Carlo Rotella, Professor of English and Director of American Studies, Boston College: The signifying place of music in human lives.

S
 Laurent Saloff-Coste, Professor of Mathematics, Cornell University: Diffusions and random walks on groups.
 James Sanders, Principal, James Sanders & Associates; Director, Center for Urban Experience, New York City: The experience of cities.
 Richard Sandler, Film Maker, New York City: Film making.
 Paul Sattler, Artist, Greenfield Center, New York; Associate Professor of Art and Art History, Skidmore College: Painting.
 George Saunders, Writer, Syracuse, New York; Associate Professor of English, Syracuse University: Fiction.
 Norbert F. Scherer, Professor of Chemistry, James Franck Institute and Institute for Biophysical Dynamics, University of Chicago: Long-range electron transfer processes in single proteins.
 Ronald Schuchard, Goodrich C. White Professor of English, Emory University: A complete edition of T. S. Eliot's prose.
 James Shapiro, Larry Miller Professor of English and Comparative Literature, Columbia University: The Shakespeare authorship controversy.
 Stephen J. Shoemaker, Assistant Professor of Religious Studies, University of Oregon: The end of Muhammad's life in Christian and early Islamic sources.
 Andrew Shryock, Associate Professor of Anthropology, University of Michigan: The politics of hospitality in Jordan.
 Britta Sjogren, Film Maker, San Francisco; Associate Professor of Cinema, San Francisco State University: Film making.
 John D. Skrentny, Professor of Sociology, University of California, San Diego: The new racial division of labor in America.
 Daniel Lord Smail, Professor of History, Harvard University: Fama and the culture of publicity in medieval Mediterranean Europe.
 Laurence C. Smith, Professor of Geography, University of California, Los Angeles: The significance of Arctic warming for the planet and society.
 Joel Sobel, Professor of Economics, University of California, San Diego: Information aggregation and group decisions.
 Carl Sander Socolow, Photographer, Camp Hill, Pennsylvania: Photography.
 Steve Stern, Writer, Ballston Spa, New York; Professor of Literature and Creative Writing, Skidmore College: Fiction.
 James A. Stimson, Raymond Dawson Bicentennial Distinguished Professor of Political Science, University of North Carolina, Chapel Hill: The liberalism of professed conservatives in America.
 Darin Strauss, Writer, Brooklyn, New York; Adjunct Professor in Creative Writing, New York University: Fiction.
 Linda Svendsen, Screenwriter, Vancouver, British Columbia, Canada; Professor of Theatre, Film, and Creative Writing, University of British Columbia: Screenwriting.
 Cole Swensen, Poet, Washington, D.C.; Associate Professor of Creative Writing and Comparative Literature, University of Iowa: Poetry.

T
 Jeff Talman, Sound Artist, Brooklyn, New York; Assistant Professor of Visual and Media Arts, Emerson College: Sound Art.
 John A. Tarduno, Professor of Geophysics and Chair, Earth and Environmental Sciences, and Professor of Physics and Astronomy, University of Rochester: The geomagnetic field and magnetic shielding of the early Earth.
 Tony Tasset, Artist, Oak Park, Illinois; Professor, School of Art and Design, College of Architecture and the Arts, University of Illinois, Chicago: Sculpture.
 William Taubman, Bertrand Snell Professor of Political Science, Amherst College: A biography of Mikhail Gorbachev.
 Jackie Tileston, Artist, Philadelphia; Associate Professor of Fine Arts, University of Pennsylvania: Painting.
 Lynne Tillman, Writer, New York City; Professor of English and Writer-in-Residence, The University at Albany: Fiction.
 Daniel Trueman, Composer, Princeton, New Jersey; Assistant Professor of Music, Princeton University: Music composition.
 Basil Twist, Theatre Artist, New York City; Artistic Director, Tandem Otter Productions: A theatre piece.

U
 Peter Uvin, Professor of International Humanitarian Studies, Fletcher School, Tufts University: Post-conflict agenda in Burundi from the local perspective.

V
 Noël Valis, Professor of Spanish, Yale University: Catholicism in modern Spanish narrative.
 Jennifer Vanderbes, Writer, New York City: Fiction.

W
 Stewart Wallace, Composer, New York City: Music composition.
 Shui-Bo Wang, Film Maker, Montreal, Canada; Director, Experimental Film Department, Central Academy of Fine Arts, Beijing, China; Film Director, National Film Board, Saint-Laurent, Canada: Film making.
 Allen Wells, Roger Howell, Jr., Professor of History, Bowdoin College: General Trujillo, Franklin D. Roosevelt, and the Jews of Sosua (Dominican Republic).
 Leon Wieseltier, Literary Editor, The New Republic: Translation of unpublished writings by Yehuda Amichai.
 Hilary Wilder, Artist, Houston; Instructor, Glassell School of Art, Museum of Fine Arts, Houston: Painting and installation art.
 Anne Winters, Poet, Evanston, Illinois; Professor of English, University of Illinois, Chicago: Poetry.

Y
 John Yau, Poet, New York City; Assistant Professor of Critical Studies, Mason Gross School of the Arts, Rutgers University: Poetry.
 Robert A. Yelle, Postdoctoral Fellow, Illinois Program for Research in the Humanities; Visiting Assistant Professor, Program for the Study of Religion, University of Illinois, Urbana-Champaign: The influence of Protestant literalism on modern law and religion.
 Bin Yu, Professor of Statistics, University of California, Berkeley: Interpretable models for high-dimensional data.

Z
 Dennis Zaritsky, Professor of Astronomy, Steward Observatory, University of Arizona: Studies in astronomical image analysis.
 Julian Zelizer, Professor of History, Boston University: National security politics from the Cold War to the war on terrorism.
 Shuguang Zhang, Associate Director, Center for Biomedical Engineering, Massachusetts Institute of Technology: A biosolar nanodevice for direct harvest of solar energy.

Latin American and Caribbean Fellows

A
 Jorge Accame, Writer, San Salvador de Jujuy, Argentina, and Professor of Social Sciences and Humanities, University of Jujuy: Fiction.
 Humberto Ak'abal, Writer, Momostenango, Totonicapán, Guatemala: Poetry.
 Gabriela Alemán, Professor of Contemporary Arts, University of San Francisco de Quito, Cumbayá, Ecuador: Ecuadorian documentary film, 1920-200.

B
 Juan Bacigalupo, Professor of Biology, University of Chile, Santiago: New insights in olfactory transduction.

C
 Rodrigo Cánovas, Professor of Humanities, Pontifical Catholic University of Chile, Santiago: Chilean and Mexican writers of Arab and Jewish origin.
 Yoan Capote, Artist, Havana, Cuba: Sculpture and installation art.
 Miguel José de Asúa, Researcher, National Research Council of Argentina (CONICET), Buenos Aires: Science, medicine, and natural history in early modern Rio de la Plata and Paraguay.

D
 Christopher Dominguez Michael, Writer, Coyoacán, Mexico: Octavio Paz and the relation of the writer to politics.

F
 Soledad Fariña, Poet, Santiago, Chile; Professor of Literature, University of Chile; Professor of Literature, University of Diego Portales: Poetry.
 Graciela Frigerio, Director, Center for Multidisciplinary Studies; Director, Master's Degree Program in Education, National University of Entre Ríos, Argentina: State discourse on infancy in Argentina.

J
 Alfredo Juan, Professor of Solid State Physics and Thermodynamics, National University of the South, Argentina; Independent Researcher, National Research Council of Argentina (CONICET): A theoretical approach to the hydrogen-metal interaction.

K
 Alicia Juliana Kowaltowski, Associate Professor of Biochemistry, University of São Paulo: Mitochondrial regulation of cell survival.

L
 Mirta Zaida Lobato, Associate Professor, Faculty of Arts, University of Buenos Aires: Culture, identity, and politics in the Latin American working class.
 Florencia Luna, Adjunct Researcher, National Research Council of Argentina (CONICET): Post-trial obligations.

M
 Mario G. Maldonado, Henry R. Luce Professor in Brain, Mind and Medicine: Cross-Cultural Perspectives, Claremont Colleges, California: Diagnostic Skills of Quichua Healers of the Andes.
 Pablo A. Marquet, Professor of Ecology, Pontifical Catholic University of Chile, Santiago: Key problems in macroecology.
 Myriam Moscona, Poet, Mexico City: Poetry.

O
 David Oubiña, Professor, Faculty of Philosophy and Letters, University of Buenos Aires; Professor, Faculty of Cinematography, University of the Cinema, Buenos Aires: Transformations of authorship in Argentine cinema, 1960-1980.

P
 Vicente Palermo, Independent Researcher, Gino Germani Institute (UBA), National Research Council of Argentina (CONICET); Professor and Researcher, FLACSO - Argentina: Republic, market, and society in Argentina and Brazil.
 Edmundo Paz Soldán, Associate Professor of Romance Studies, Cornell University: Fiction.
 Gabriela Prado, Choreographer, Buenos Aires; Professor of Dance, National University of Arts (IUNA), Buenos Aires: Choreography.
 Fernando Prats, Artist, Barcelona, Spain: Painting.

R
 Gabriel Adrián Rabinovich, Independent Researcher, National Research Council of Argentina (CONICET): The impact of protein-glycan interactions in tumor-immune escape.
 Laura Restrepo, Writer, Bogota, Colombia: Fiction.
 Gustavo Romano, Artist, Buenos Aires: Digital art.
 Ethelia Ruiz Medrano, Professor in Historical Studies, National Institute of Anthropology and History, México: Historical arguments for Indian rights.

S
 Lilia Moritz Schwarcz, Professor of Social Anthropology, University of São Paulo: The "invention" of the tropics in colonial Brazil.
 Victor Sira, Photographer, New York City: Photography.
 Gabriela Siracusano, Career Scientific Researcher, National Research Council of Argentina (CONICET); Professor, Faculty of Philosophy and Letters, University of Buenos Aires; President, Centro Argentino de investigadores de Arte: The ritual uses of pigments in 16th- and 17th-century Andean and Spanish artistic practices.
 Maristella Noemí Svampa, Associate Professor, National University of General Sarmiento, Buenos Aires: The mind-set of protestors in contemporary cases of Latin American mass mobilization.

T
 Mariano Tommasi, Professor and Chair, Department of Economics, University of San Andrés, Buenos Aires; President, Latin American and Caribbean Economic Association: Political institutions, state capacities, and the quality of public policy.
 Alejandro Toro-Labbé, Professor of Chemistry, Pontifical Catholic University of Chile, Santiago: A new concept to characterize reaction mechanisms.
 Diego F. Torres, Ramon y Cajal Researcher, Higher Council of Scientific Investigation, Barcelona, Spain: High-energy emission from regions of star formation.
 Juan Travnik, Photographer, Buenos Aires; Director, Fotogalería del Teatro San Martín, Buenos Aires: Photography.

References

External links
2006 Guggenheim Foundation Fellows
John Simon Guggenheim Memorial Foundation home page

2006
2006 awards
Gugg